Ayton and Burnmouth Parish Church is a member church of the Church of Scotland, serving the communities of Ayton and Burnmouth in the Scottish Borders.

History 
There are charters of the late 11th and early 12th centuries granting the lands of Eiton, as Ayton was then known, to Coldingham Priory. The lands were granted by King Edgar of Scotland (ruled 1097–1107). By the end of the 12th century, the monks of Coldingham had built a chapel dedicated St. Dionysius. The church later received an altar dedicated to the Virgin Mary, with endowments of various acres and rigs in the Lordship of Ayton.

The old chapel, which had been extensively altered and renewed over the years up to the 18th century was, originally, a simple rectangular building, but changed to a T shape with the addition of the north aisle. Many of the early Norman features were altered or even removed in the 17th and 18th centuries.

The Chapel of St. Dionysius was an important place in medieval Scotland, it played host to several meetings of commissioners from Scotland and England, in their efforts to come to treaty, including those in 1380, 1384 and 1497. The meeting of 1497 involved the Spanish diplomat Pedro de Ayala on behalf of James IV of Scotland with representatives of Henry VII of England, and the outcome was a seven-year truce. St. Dionysius' Church continued as a Roman Catholic place of worship in the hands of the monks of Coldingham until the Scottish Reformation, when it became part of the reformed church.

Post-Reformation 
The old church buildings continued with several alterations and renovations (see above) until it no longer was fit for purpose. In 1864, a new church was built just outside the village, adjacent to the ancient church. The church was built by eminent 19th century architect James Maitland Wardrop, in the "First Pointed" style of Gothic architecture, and is a near T-shape with a 3-stage square-plan tower. The 19th-century Ayton Parish Church is a category A listed building, the highest level of protection for a historic building in Scotland, while the ruined St. Dionysius' Church is listed at category B.

List of Post-Reformation ministers 
1574  John Kent 
1604  William Hog 
1653  William Home 
1667  John Bethune 
1712  Thomas Anderson

References

External links 
 St. Dionysius : Defending the Faith

Category A listed buildings in the Scottish Borders
Churches in the Scottish Borders
Listed churches in Scotland